These are the Canadian number-one country songs of 1981, per the RPM Country Tracks chart.

See also
1981 in music
List of number-one country hits of 1981 (U.S.)

References
Citations

External links
 Read about RPM Magazine at the AV Trust
 Search RPM charts here at Library and Archives Canada

 
Country
1981